The Assyrian captivity (or the Assyrian exile) is the period in the history of ancient Israel and Judah during which several thousand Israelites from the Kingdom of Israel were forcibly relocated by the Neo-Assyrian Empire. This is one of the many instances of the resettlement policy of the Neo-Assyrian Empire. The Kingdom of Israel was conquered by the Neo-Assyrian monarchs Tiglath-Pileser III and Shalmaneser V. The later Assyrian rulers Sargon II and his son and successor, Sennacherib, were responsible for finishing the twenty-year demise of Israel's northern ten-tribe kingdom, although they did not overtake the Kingdom of Judah. Jerusalem was besieged, but not taken. The tribes forcibly resettled by Assyria later became known as the Ten Lost Tribes.

Biblical account 
The captivities began in approximately 740 BCE (or 733/2 BCE according to other sources).
And the God of Israel stirred up the spirit of Pul king of Assyria, and the spirit of Tilgathpilneser king of Assyria, and he carried them away, even the Reubenites, and the Gadites, and the half tribe of Manasseh, and brought them unto Halah, and Habor, and Hara, and to the river Gozan, unto this day.

In the days of Pekah king of Israel came Tiglathpileser king of Assyria, and he took Ijon, and Abel Beth Maacah, and Janoah, and Kedesh and Hazor, and Gilead, and Galilee, all the land of Naphtali, and carried them captive to Assyria.

In 722 BCE, ten to twenty years after the initial deportations, the ruling city of the Northern Kingdom of Israel, Samaria, was finally taken by Sargon II after a three-year siege started by Shalmaneser V.

Against him came up Shalmaneser king of Assyria; and Hoshea became his servant, and gave him presents.
And the king of Assyria found conspiracy in Hoshea: for he had sent messengers to So king of Egypt, and brought no present to the king of Assyria, as he had done year by year: therefore the king of Assyria shut him up, and bound him in prison.
Then the king of Assyria came up throughout all the land, and went up to Samaria, and besieged it three years.
In the ninth year of Hoshea the king of Assyria took Samaria, and carried Israel away into Assyria, and placed them in Halah and in Habor by the river of Gozan, and in the cities of the Medes.

The king of Assyria carried the Israelites away to Assyria, settled them in Halah, on the Habor, the river of Gozan, and in the cities of the Medes, because they did not obey the voice of the  their God but transgressed His covenant — all that Moses the servant of the  had commanded; they neither listened nor obeyed.

The term "cities of the Medes" mentioned above may be a corruption from an original text "Mountains of Media".

And when Asa heard these words, even the prophecy of Oded the prophet, he took courage, and put away the detestable things out of all the land of Judah and Benjamin, and out of the cities which he had taken from the hill-country of Ephraim; and he renewed the altar of the LORD, that was before the porch of the LORD.
And he gathered all Judah and Benjamin, and them that sojourned with them out of Ephraim and Manasseh, and out of Simeon; for they fell to him out of Israel in abundance, when they saw that the LORD his God was with him.
So they gathered themselves together at Jerusalem in the third month, in the fifteenth year of the reign of Asa.

According to 2nd Chronicles, Chapter 30, there is evidence that at least some people of the Northern Kingdom of Israel were not exiled. These were invited by king Hezekiah to keep the Passover in a feast at Jerusalem with the Judean population. (The holiday was set one month forward from its original date.) Hezekiah sent his posts to spread the word among the remnant of the Northern kingdom; the posts were mocked during their visit to the country of Ephraim, Manasseh and Zebulun. However, some people of Asher and Manasseh and of Zebulun humbled themselves and came to Jerusalem. In a later part of the chapter, even people from the Tribe of Issachar and the strangers that "came out from the land of Israel" were said to take part in the passover event. Biblical scholars such as Umberto Cassuto and Elia Samuele Artom claimed that Hezekiah might have annexed these territories, in which inhabitants of the Kingdom of Israel remained, into his own kingdom.
And Hezekiah sent to all Israel and Judah, and wrote letters also to Ephraim and Manasseh, that they should come to the house of the LORD at Jerusalem, to keep the passover unto the LORD, the God of Israel.

So they established a decree to make proclamation throughout all Israel, from Beer-sheba even to Dan, that they should come to keep the passover unto the LORD, the God of Israel, at Jerusalem; for they had not kept it in great numbers accordingly, as it is written.
So the posts went with the letters from the king and his princes throughout all Israel and Judah, according to the commandment of the king, saying: 'Ye children of Israel, turn back unto the LORD, the God of Abraham, Isaac, and Israel, that He may return to the remnant that are escaped out of the hand of the kings of Assyria.
And be ye not like your fathers and like your brethren who acted treacherously against the LORD, the God of their fathers, so that He delivered them to desolation, as ye see.
Now be ye not stiffnecked as your fathers were, but yield yourselves unto the LORD and enter into His sanctuary which He hath sanctified for ever; and serve the LORD your God that His fierce anger may turn away from you.
For if ye turn back unto the LORD, your brethren and your children shall find compassion before them that led them captive, and shall come back into this land; for the LORD your God is gracious and merciful, and will not turn away His face from you if ye return unto Him.'

So the posts passed from city to city through the country of Ephraim and Manasseh, even unto Zebulun; but they laughed them to scorn, and mocked them.
Nevertheless certain men of Asher and Manasseh and of Zebulun humbled themselves, and came to Jerusalem.

For a multitude of the people, even many of Ephraim and Manasseh, Issachar and Zebulun, had not cleansed themselves, yet did they eat the passover otherwise than it is written. For Hezekiah had prayed for them, saying: 'The good LORD pardon ...'

And all the congregation of Judah, with the priests and the Levites, and all the congregation that came out of Israel, and the strangers that came out of the land of Israel, and that dwelt in Judah, rejoiced.
So there was great joy in Jerusalem; for since the time of Solomon the son of David king of Israel there was not the like in Jerusalem.

In 2nd Chronicles, Chapter 31, it is said that the remnant of the Kingdom of Israel returned to their homes, but not before destroying Ba'al and Ashera places of Idol worship left in "all Judah and Benjamin, in Ephraim also and Manasseh".

Now when all this was finished, all Israel that were present went out to the cities of Judah, and broke in pieces the pillars, and hewed down the Asherim, and broke down the high places and the altars out of all Judah and Benjamin, in Ephraim also and Manasseh, until they had destroyed them all. Then all the children of Israel returned, every man to his possession, into their own cities.

Assyrian cuneiform 
Assyrian cuneiform states that 27,290 captives were taken from Samaria, the capital of the Northern Kingdom of Israel, by the hand of Sargon II.

Sargon records his first campaign on the walls of the royal palace at Dur-Sharrukin (Khorsabad):

In my first year of reign *** the people of Samaria *** to the number of 27,290 ... I carried away.

Fifty chariots for my royal equipment I selected. The city I rebuilt. I made it greater than it was before.

People of the lands I had conquered I settled therein. My official (Tartan) I placed over them as governor. (L.ii.4.)

The description of the final defeat of the Northern Kingdom of Israel above appears to be a minor event in Sargon's legacy. Some historians attribute the ease of Israel's defeat to the previous two decades of invasions, defeats, and deportations.

Some estimates assume a captivity numbering in the hundreds of thousands, minus those who died in defense of the kingdom and minus those who fled voluntarily before and during the invasions. It has also been suggested that the numbers deported by the Assyrians were rather limited and the bulk of the population remained in situ. There is also evidence that significant numbers fled south to the Kingdom of Judah. Archaeologically speaking, it is known that the invasion was accompanied by large-scale destruction and abandonment at many sites.

Return 
Unlike the Kingdom of Judah, which was able to return from its Babylonian captivity, the ten tribes of the Northern Kingdom never had a foreign edict granting permission to return and rebuild their homeland. Many centuries later, rabbis of the restored Kingdom of Judah were still debating the return of the lost ten tribes.

According to the Books of Chronicles chapter 9 verse 3, the Israelites, who took part in the Return to Zion, are stated to be from the Tribe of Judah alongside the Tribe of Simeon that was absorbed into it, the Tribe of Benjamin, the Tribe of Levi (Levites and Priests) alongside the tribes of Ephraim and Manasseh, which according to the Book of Kings 2 Chapter 7 were supposedly exiled by the Assyrians (the Biblical scholars Umberto Cassuto and Elia Samuele Artom claimed these two tribes' names to be a reference to the remnant of all Ten Tribes that was not exiled and absorbed into the Judean population).

And in Jerusalem dwelt of the children of Judah, and of the children of Benjamin, and of the children of Ephraim and Manasseh.()

The historical accuracy by the prophet Ezra is complete only when the details of the Apocrypha's 1st and 2nd Esdras are referenced, since this is where the complete history of the dispersion of the Northern Kingdom tribes is found.()

See also 
 Hoshea

References

Further reading
Keller, Werner. The Bible as History  

8th-century BC in Assyria
Ancient Israel and Judah
Books of Chronicles
Books of Kings
Kingdom of Israel (Samaria)
Ten Lost Tribes